Binah ("Insight") is a Jewish women's magazine published weekly by Binah Magazine Corporation in the United States. Additional distribution takes place in the United Kingdom and Israel. Binah Magazine Corporation is a subsidiary of Hamodia Publishing Corporation. The magazine debuted in Elul 5766 (Fall 2006).

Binah features articles appealing to Jewish women, including family matters, health, recipes, short stories and serialized novels. It is known for its full-color, glossy pages and its coverage of topics not usually discussed in mainstream Orthodox Jewish publications, such as divorce, single-parenting, home budgeting, and medical conditions. Its articles often create a buzz in Orthodox circles and online blogs. For example, a 2012 article on summer camp security led to a summer-camp inspection by New York Assemblyman Dov Hikind and New York State Senate hopeful Simcha Felder (he was elected to office a few months later) at Camp Agudah in upstate New York.

Fiction
Each issue of Binah includes fiction, poetry, and serialized novels. Novels originally serialized in Binah and Binah Bunch have been published by mainstream Jewish book publishers. These include:
Dual Dilemmas
Full Harvest
Pass or Fail
Shortchanged

Spinoffs
Binah first food editor, Estee Kafra, spun off her weekly kosher recipe column into two cookbooks, Spice It Right and Cooking With Color.

Chaya Feigy Grossman, author of a cooking column in Binah Bunch, published a collection of her children's recipes in The Cherry on Top: A Kosher Junior Cookbook (Feldheim Publishers, 2008).

References

External links
 Official website

2006 establishments in New York (state)
Jewish magazines published in the United States
Magazines established in 2006
Magazines published in New York City
Weekly magazines published in the United States
Women's magazines published in the United States